Albert Edward Burns Alexander Sr. (21 Sep 1867 - 14 Oct 1953) was a figure in early 20th century English football who held a number of roles at Manchester City.

Born in Hulme, Alexander was one of four sons involved in the coach proprietorship business. He lived in Ardwick from 1871 to at least the 1920s, having married a storekeeper's daughter, Evelyn Bridge, in St Matthew's there in June 1891.
Alexander's connections with Manchester City go back to at least 1904. That year Manchester City reached the FA Cup final for the first time. The club directors hired a horse-drawn carriage to make the journey to London, with Alexander as the driver. By the 1920s, Alexander was the club's vice-chairman, and had also formed and coached the "A" team, the club's first youth development side.

In 1925 manager David Ashworth resigned. Unable to find a suitable replacement, the directors selected the team by committee. Alexander led the panel with assistance from figures including Lawrence Furniss and Wilf Wild. Under the Alexander-led committee the club achieved a record 6–1 Manchester derby win, and reached the 1926 FA Cup Final, though City were defeated 1–0 by Bolton Wanderers. On 26 April 1926, Peter Hodge was appointed manager, and Alexander's period in charge came to an end.

Alexander's son, Albert Victor, was Manchester City chairman in the 1960s, and through Albert Jr. and his son Eric the Alexander family had a presence on the club board until 1972.

References

English football managers
Manchester City F.C. directors and chairmen
Manchester City F.C. managers
1867 births
1953 deaths